Arena Holdings, formerly known as Tiso Blackstar Group, Johnnic Communications, Avusa and Times Media Group, is a media company in South Africa. Avusa means "to rouse feelings, to revive and evoke action". The name was changed in 2007 in order to avoid confusion between Johnnic Communications and Johnnic Holdings. The name was changed again (to Tiso Blackstar) in 2017.

In 2012, Avusa was acquired by a unit of Mvelaphanda Group and renamed Times Media Group, which was then relisted on the JSE. In 2013, Times Media Group acquired the remaining 50% of BDFM from Pearson.

In 2019, Tiso Blackstar Group sold its print, broadcasting and content assets to Lebashe Investment Group for  billion. It was then announced that the assets would form a new company called Arena Holdings.

Publications and services

Magazines 
 avocado (closed)
 Computing SA
 Elle
 Financial Mail
 Home Owner
 Longevity (sold)
 SA Mining
 Soccerlife
 Top Huis

Newspapers 
 Business Day
 Daily Dispatch
 The Herald
 Saturday Dispatch
 The Sowetan
 The Sunday Times
 Sunday World
 The Times
 Weekend Post
 Times Media community newspapers
 Algoa Sun
 Go! & Express
 Our Times
 The Rep
 Talk of the Town

Retailers 
 Exclusive Books (sold)
 Nu Metro Cinemas (sold)

Publishers
 New Holland Publishers
 Mediaguide
 Picasso Headline (pty) Ltd.

Digital
Avusa created a network of its own websites, named Times Media Live, in 2010. In 2011 this network began to expand from three sites to 21 in 2014, made up mostly of disparate websites within the Group (Times Live, Sowetan Live, BDLIVE, Financial Mail, HeraldLive and more) including the African representation of The Daily Telegraph. In doing so, Times Media Live became the second largest publisher network and thereafter Times Live the second largest website in South Africa. Times Media Live was the first large media-owned publisher to reach profitability in the 2013 financial year. In 2014 The Rand Daily Mail was resuscitated as an online-only brand.

Picasso Headline currently publishes:
African Leader - Quarterly magazine published on behalf of the Black Management Forum (BMF)
SA Schools and Tertiary Collection - An annual directory of SA schools and tertiary institutions
Rock, Surf and Deep RSD - A monthly on-shelf salt water fishing magazine, including African Angling Destinations Guides
Voice of Local Government - Quarterly magazine published on behalf of the South African Local Government Association (SALGA)
Digest of SA Architecture - Annual magazine showcasing projects of the year, published on behalf of the SA Institute of Architects (SAIA), primarily for its members
Architecture SA - Alternate monthly magazine published on behalf of the SA Institute of Architects (SAIA), primarily for its members
New Agenda - A quarterly magazine published on behalf of the Institute for African Alternatives. This publication is the South African Journal of Social and Economic Policy.
SA Banker - Quarterly magazine published on behalf of the Banking Association of South Africa (BASA) and the Institute of Bankers (IOB)

In April 2019, Tiso Blacksar relaunched Vrye Weekblad.

Music
 Gallo Record Company

Controversies

Accusations of fake news 
On 27 November 2016, The Sunday Times published a story claiming that South African radio and television personality, and former Idols SA judge, Gareth Cliff had "admitted to giving fellow Idols SA judge Marah Louw the spiked drink that led to her notorious slurring and swearing on live TV", with further suggestions made that the incident had resulted in Louw's contract not being renewed. As a result of the article, Gareth Cliff was the victim of many insults on social media, before releasing a statement on Facebook confronting the false allegations printed in the Sunday Times. Susan Smuts, Managing Editor of the Times, responded to Cliff's lawyer, admitting that there had been "misinterpretations". Cliff, via his lawyer, demanded an unreserved apology from the Times.

See also
 List of South African media
 Naspers
 Independent News and Media
 Caxton/CTP

References

External links
 

Companies listed on the Johannesburg Stock Exchange
South African companies established in 2007
Companies based in Johannesburg
Mass media companies established in 2007